HMS Lee was a Doxford three funnel - 30 knot destroyer ordered by the Royal Navy under the 1898 – 1899 Naval Estimates.  She was the sixth ship to carry this name since its introduction in 1776 for a 6-gun sloop for service on the Great Lakes.

Construction and career
She was laid down on 4 January 1898 at the William Doxford and Sons shipyard at Pallion, Sunderland and launched on 27 January 1899.  During her acceptance trials she took a very long time to attain the contract speed of 30 knots and was not accepted into the Royal Navy until March 1901.

After commissioning she was deployed to the Channel Fleet and based at Shearness as part of the Medway Instructional Flotilla. In December 1901 she was replaced in the flotilla by Mermaid, her crew was transferred to the latter ship, and she paid off into the Fleet Reserve.

On 5 October 1909 she was wrecked off Blacksod Bay on the west coast of Ireland.

Pennant Numbers
During her career she was not assigned a pennant (pendant) number.

References
NOTE:  All tabular data under General Characteristics only from the listed Jane's Fighting Ships volume unless otherwise specified

Bibliography
 
 
 
 
 
 
 
 

 

Ships built on the River Wear
1899 ships
C-class destroyers (1913)
Maritime incidents in 1909
Shipwrecks of Ireland